The Mud Hills are a low mountain range in the Mojave Desert, in San Bernardino County, southern California.

They are north of Barstow, California, and northwest of the Calico Mountains.

The Mud Hills are located southwest of Lane Mountain, southeast of Black Mountain and Opal Mountain, northeast of Mount General, and east of Water Valley.

References 

Mountain ranges of the Mojave Desert
Mountain ranges of Southern California
Mountain ranges of San Bernardino County, California